Road signs in India can vary in design, depending on the location. For most part, they tend to closely follow European practices, usually identical with the United Kingdom or the Vienna Convention on Road Signs and Signals, although yellow rectangular signs that do carry such messages like "Be gentle on my curves" and "Danger creeps when safety sleeps" are present nationwide. Road signs in India are metric.

There is no official typeface for road signs in India. Typically, road signs may use hand-painted fonts, but some road signs in India use Arial, Highway Gothic or Transport.

Most urban roads and state highways have signs in the state language and English. National highways have signs in the state language, Hindi and English.

In 2012, the Tourism department of Kerala announced plans to upgrade road signs in the state to include maps of nearby hospitals. The Noida Authority announced plans to replace older signboards with new fluorescent signage.

Gallery 
A circle with a slash shows prohibited activities and circles without slashes show rules. Triangles indicate warnings and show risks. Blue circles indicate mandatory instructions and are there for a particular classes of vehicles. Otherwise, the regular colour of sign boards is red and white.

Mandatory/Regulatory Signs

Cautionary/Warning Signs

Guide Signs

References

 
Road transport in India